Hard 2 Love is the second studio album by American country music artist Lee Brice. It was released on April 24, 2012 via Curb Records. The album includes the number one single "A Woman Like You."

Critical reception

At USA Today, Brian Mansfield rated the album three-and-a-half stars out of four, remarking that the release "is as well-crafted a set of country tunes as you'll hear all year." Stephen Thomas Erlewine rated the album three-and-a-half stars out of five, observing how "Perhaps the album could use a song that grabbed you by the throat but it's sturdy and quietly persuasive, its strengths sounding clearer and bolder with each listen."

Commercial performance
As of November 6, 2013, the album has sold 471,000 copies in the U.S.

Track listing

Personnel
Compiled from liner notes.

Musicians

"Hard to Love"
 Ben Glover – background vocals
 Tommy Harden – drums, percussion
 Mark Hill – bass guitar
 Jedd Hughes – acoustic guitar
 Kyle Jacobs – background vocals
 Mike Johnson – steel guitar
 Jeff King – electric guitar
 Matt McClure – background vocals
 Jerry McPherson – electric guitar
 Jason Webb – Hammond B-3 organ

"A Woman Like You"
 Mike Brignardello – bass guitar
 Jim "Moose" Brown – piano
 Pat McGrath – acoustic guitar, resonator guitar
 Russ Pahl – steel guitar
 Brian Pruitt – drums, percussion
 Adam Shoenfeld – electric guitar

"That's When You Know It's Over"
 J. T. Corenflos – electric guitar
 Dennis Holt – drums
 Charles Judge – Hammond B-3 organ, synthesizer, programming
 Jeff King – electric guitar
 Jimmie Lee Sloas – bass guitar
 Pat McGrath – acoustic guitar
 Russ Pahl – steel guitar
 Ilya Toshinsky – mandolin

"Parking Lot Party"
 Tom Bukovac – electric guitar
 Lee Brice – electric guitar
 Shawn Fichter – drums
 Jedd Hughes – electric guitar
 Tony Lucido – bass guitar

"Don't Believe Everything You Think"
 Tom Bukovac – electric guitar
 Perry Coleman – background vocals
 Shawn Fichter – drums, percussion
 Jedd Hughes – acoustic guitar, electric guitar
 Charles Judge – Rhodes piano, synthesizer
 Tony Lucido – bass guitar
 Russ Pahl – steel guitar
 Ilya Toshinsky – mandolin

"I Drive Your Truck"
 Tommy Harden – drums
 Mark Hill – bass guitar
 Jedd Hughes – acoustic guitar
 Mike Johnson – steel guitar
 Jeff King – electric guitar
 Jerry McPherson – electric guitar
 Russell Terrell – background vocals
 Jason Webb – piano, Hammond B-3 organ

"See About a Girl"
 Mark Hill – bass guitar
 Dennis Holt – drums, percussion
 Kyle Jacobs – piano
 Jeff King – electric guitar
 Phillip Lammonds – mandolin
 Jerry McPherson – electric guitar
 Pat McGrath – acoustic guitar, mandolin
 Sara Reeveley – phone call
 Russell Terrell – background vocals
 Jason Webb – piano

"Friends We Won't Forget"
 Lee Brice – acoustic guitar
 Pat Buchanan – electric guitar
 Kenny Greenberg – electric guitar
 Tully Kennedy – electric guitar
 Rich Redmond – drums
 Ed Seay – background vocals
 Reggie Smith – Hammond B-3 organ
 Jimmie Lee Sloas – bass guitar
 Jon Stone – background vocals

"Life Off My Years"
 Tom Bukovac – electric guitar, acoustic guitar
 Perry Coleman – background vocals
 Shawn Fichter – drums
 Jedd Hughes – electric guitar, acoustic guitar
 Charles Judge – Hammond B-3 organ, synthesizer, percussion
 Tony Lucido – bass guitar
 Marcus Myers – dulcimer
 Russ Pahl – steel guitar
 Ilya Toshinsky – mandolin

"Seven Days a Thousand Times"
 Tom Bukovac – acoustic guitar, electric guitar
 Perry Coleman – background vocals
 Charles Judge – piano, synthesizer, programming
 Chris McHugh – drums
 Jimmie Lee Sloas – bass guitar
 Jon Stone – background vocals
 Ilya Toshinsky – mandolin

"Beer"
 Lee Brice – acoustic guitar
 Pat Buchanan – electric guitar
 Kenny Greenberg – electric guitar
 Chris Janson – harmonica
 Tully Kennedy – electric guitar
 Rich Redmond – drums
 Ed Seay – background vocals
 Jimmie Lee Sloas – bass guitar
 Reggie Smith – Hammond B-3 organ
 Jon Stone – background vocals

"That Way Again"
 David Angell – violin
 Lee Brice – acoustic guitar
 John Catchings – cello
 David Davidson – violin
 Reg Smith – Hammond B-3 organ
 Kristin Wilkinson – viola

"One More Day"
 Lee Brice – acoustic guitar
 Tom Bukovac – 12-string guitar
 Shawn Fichter – drums, percussion
 Jedd Hughes – electric guitar
 Tony Lucido – bass guitar
 Reg Smith – piano

Technical

 Steve Blackmon – editing on "See About a Girl"
 Drew Bollman – recording
 Lee Brice – production 
 Dan Frizsell – engineering
 Don Hart – string arrangements and conducting on "That Way Again"
 Kyle Jacobs – production 
 Doug Johnson – production , engineering
 Matt McClure – production , recording, overdubbing, engineering, mixing
 Justin Niebank – recording, mixing
 Ed Seay – engineering
 Jon Stone – production 
 Hank Williams – mastering

Charts

Weekly charts

Year-end charts

Singles

Certifications

References

2012 albums
Lee Brice albums
Curb Records albums